Contraxiala is a genus of sea snails, marine gastropod mollusks in the family Pyramidellidae, the pyrams and their allies.

Species
There is only one known species to exist within the genus Contraxiala, this includes the following:
 Contraxiala obliqua Laseron, 1956

References

External links
 To World Register of Marine Species
 Ponder W. F. (1985). A review of the Genera of the Rissoidae (Mollusca: Mesogastropoda: Rissoacea). Records of the Australian Museum supplement 4: 1-221

Pyramidellidae
Monotypic gastropod genera